James Aloysius Joyce (October 23, 1924 – October 24, 2006) was an American professional basketball player. He played in the National Basketball League for the Tri-Cities Blackhawks in one game during the 1947–48 season. He also competed in the New York State Professional Basketball League and the Eastern Basketball League. In Joyce's post-playing career, he first taught physical education in Ferris, Delaware before working in the Traffic Department in Hercules, Delaware.

References

External links
 Jimmy Joyce obituary

1924 births
2006 deaths
American men's basketball players
Basketball players from Philadelphia
Forwards (basketball)
 Basketball players from Wilmington, Delaware
Temple Owls men's basketball players
Tri-Cities Blackhawks players